Novi Vinodolski (often also called Novi or Novi del Vinodol o Novi in Valdivino in Italian) is a town on the Adriatic Sea coast in Croatia, located south of Crikvenica, Selce and Bribir and north of Senj. The population of Novi is 3,988, with a total of 5,131 people in the city administered area. The city area became a Frankopan property in the 13th century, marking the period to which the most valuable heritage is dated, including the Law codex of Vinodol. City hinterland is dominated by the Vinodol Valley, used for agriculture and winemaking. The city's economy is dominated by tourism, as Novi Vinodolski is well known tourist centre situated in an area largely unaffected by other types of industry and it offers a wide variety of tourist amenities. The Vinodol Valley is also the site of a hydroelectric power plant utilizing water collected in Gorski Kotar reservoirs. Transport links of the city are substantially dependent on the nearby city of Rijeka.

History and heritage

The area of Novi Vinodolski is inhabited since prehistory, as witnessed by an archaeological site at Osap hill and Roman artifacts and remains such as the Lopsica fortress, found in the city itself and its vicinity. Settlement variously called Novi Grad or Novigrad (lit. New City) was built in the 13th century by the House of Frankopan who acquired the area as their possession at the time. Contemporary development of the region is witnessed by Vinodol Statute of 1288 and significant Glagolitic works of the era. Until the 17th century the city was ruled by the Principality of Krk or as a Frankopan estate. In the 16th century, Novi Vinodolski became a part of Habsburg Empire and it shares political fate of the Kingdom of Croatia and its successor states since then.

The city of Novi Vinodolski is the hometown of writers Ivan and Matija Mažuranić. Ivan Mažuranić was also the first Croatian ban born as a commoner. The soul of Novi Vinodolski consists of historical remains and cultural heritage, namely remains of a Paulist monastery, Frankopan fortress and castle, a cathedral, Trinity church and Saint Marinus church located on a small eponymous island, house of the Mažuranić brothers, a library built in 1845, Homeland museum and gallery, old city core, as well as preserved authentic and indigenous folk lore of the city.

Geography and climate
The city of Novi Vinodolski is situated in the northern Croatian Littoral, at Vinodol Riviera of the Adriatic Sea, south of Crikvenica, Selce and Bribir and north of Senj. The population of Novi is 4,005, with a total of 5,113 people in the city administered are. Appearance of Novi Vinodolski is characterized by coastal Mediterranean architecture of white façade houses with red rooftops in the old city's core extending from the coastline up to a church and a tower located on a hill dominating city skyline as if protecting the stone structures uphill. Due to this specific panorama, Novi Vinodolski has been recognized as a tourist city in the past and present. Because of evergreen and deciduous forests and mild Mediterranean climate, as well as clean seawater and air, the city is considered to be a leader in tourist industry of the region, second only to Opatija. City hinterland comprises Vinodol Valley (Vallis vinearia) spanning between Bakarac and Novi Vinodolski.

The city boundaries encompass the following settlements: Bater, Bile, Breze, Crno, Donji Zagon, Drinak, Gornji Zagon, Jakov Polje, Javorje, Klenovica, Krmpotske Vodice, Ledenice, Luka Krmpotska, Novi Vinodolski, Podmelnik, Povile, Ruševo Krmpotsko, Sibinj Krmpotski, Smokvica Krmpotska and Zabukovac.

Demographics

Economy and infrastructure
Economy of Novi Vinodolski is dominated by tourist industry and activities supporting that particular branch of economy. Hotels, other vacation accommodation, auto camps, bungalows, apartments and rooms in privately owned houses can accommodate over 10,000 tourists at once. The city and its surroundings provide recreational, sports, and spa facilities. City port contains berths, a filling station, and other facilities required for yachting. The city surroundings—Vinodol Valley, is used for agricultural production, especially vinegrowing and winemaking. Wines produced in the area largely resemble those produced on nearby Krk island, with Žlahtina being the predominant variety produced. In addition, Cabernet Sauvignon and Chardonnay are produced. Wine production was significantly promoted since the 1990s, when refugees from Vukovar started the Pavlomir winery there during the Croatian War of Independence. A wine produced in the region, was provided as an official wine during visit of the Pope Benedict XVI to Croatia.

The city is linked by Adriatic Highway—a  segment of the D8 state road linking it to the Croatian motorway network east of Rijeka. Rijeka acts as a transportation hub of the region offering railway links to Zagreb, Ljubljana and further on to the rest of Europe, the Rijeka Airport and the Port of Rijeka. Hrvatska elektroprivreda operates the Vinodol Hydroelectric Power Plant which utilizes several reservoirs in Gorski Kotar, such as Lake Bajer for production of electrical power. Average annual production of the power plant is 139 GWh.

Notes

External links

 Novi Vinodolski tourist office
 Novi Vinodolski
 Novi Vinodolski info

Cities and towns in Croatia
Populated coastal places in Croatia
Populated places in Primorje-Gorski Kotar County